A polo shirt, tennis shirt, golf shirt, or chukker shirt is a form of shirt with a collar. Polo shirts are usually short sleeved but can be long; they were used by polo players originally in India in 1859 and in Great Britain during the 1920s.

Polo shirts are usually made of knitted cotton (rather than woven cloth), usually a piqué knit, or less commonly an interlock knit (the latter used frequently, though not exclusively, with pima cotton polos), or using other fibers such as silk, wool, synthetic fibers, or blends of natural and synthetic fibers. A dress-length version of the shirt is called a polo dress.

History of the tennis shirt 

In the 19th and early 20th centuries, tennis players ordinarily wore "tennis whites" consisting of long-sleeved white button-up shirts (worn with the sleeves rolled up), flannel trousers, and ties. This attire presented problems for ease of play and comfort.

René Lacoste, the French seven-time Grand Slam tennis champion, felt that the stiff tennis attire was too cumbersome and uncomfortable. He designed a white, short-sleeved, loosely-knit piqué cotton (he called the cotton weave jersey petit piqué) shirt with an unstarched, flat, protruding collar, a buttoned placket, and a  shirt-tail longer in back than in front (known today as a "tennis tail"; see below), which he first wore at the 1926 U.S. Open championship.

Beginning in 1927, Lacoste placed a crocodile emblem on the left breast of his shirts, as the American press had begun to refer to him as "The Crocodile", a nickname which he embraced.

Lacoste's design mitigated the problems that traditional tennis attire created:

 the short, cuffed sleeves solved the tendency of long sleeves to roll down
 the shirt should be buttoned to the top
 the piqué collar could be worn upturned to protect the neck skin from the sun
 the jersey knit piqué cotton breathed and was more durable
 the "tennis tail" prevented the shirt from pulling out of the wearer's trousers or shorts

In 1933, after retiring from professional tennis, Lacoste teamed up with André Gillier, a friend who was a clothing merchandiser, to market that shirt in Europe and North America. Together, they formed the company Chemise Lacoste, and began selling their shirts, which included the small embroidered crocodile logo on the left breast.

Application to polo  

Until the beginning of 20th century polo players wore thick, long-sleeved shirts made of Oxford-cloth cotton. This shirt was the first to have a buttoned-down collar, which polo players invented in the late 19th century to keep their collars from flapping in the wind (Brooks Brothers' early president, John Brooks, noticed this while at a polo match in England and began producing such a shirt in 1896).

Brooks Brothers still produces this style of button-down "polo shirt". Still, like early tennis clothing, those clothes presented a discomfort on the field.

In 1920, Lewis Lacey, a Canadian (born of English parents in Montreal, Quebec in 1887) haberdasher and polo player, began producing a shirt that was embroidered with an emblem of a polo player, a design originating at the Hurlingham Polo Club near Buenos Aires.

The definition of the uniform of polo players – the polo shirt and a pair of white trousers – is actually a fairly recent addition to the sport. Until the 1940s shirts were generally very plain, with no numbers, writing or logos. When necessary, numbers (ranging from 1 – 4) were simply pinned on to the back of the player's shirts a few minutes before the start of a match.
To differentiate the polo teams from one another, some polo shirts had horizontal stripes, others bore diagonal coloured stripes.

In 1972, Ralph Lauren marketed a tennis shirt as a "polo shirt" as a prominent part of his original line Polo, thereby helping further its already widespread popularity. While not specifically designed for use by polo players, Lauren's shirt imitated what by that time had become the normal attire for polo players. As he desired to exude a certain "WASPishness" in his clothes, initially adopting the style of clothiers like Brooks Brothers, J. Press, and "Savile Row"-style English clothing, he prominently included this attire from the "sport of kings" in his line, replete with a logo reminiscent of Lacoste's crocodile emblem, depicting a polo player and pony.

Golf 
Over the latter half of the 20th century, as standard clothing in golf became more casual, the tennis shirt was adopted nearly universally as standard golf attire. Many golf courses and country clubs require players to wear golf shirts as a part of their dress code. Moreover, producing Lacoste's "tennis shirt" in various golf cuts has resulted in specific designs of the tennis shirt for golf, resulting in the moniker golf shirt.

Golf shirts are commonly made out of polyester, cotton-polyester blends, or mercerized cotton. The placket typically holds three or four buttons, and consequently extends lower than the typical polo neckline. The collar is typically fabricated using a stitched double-layer of the same fabric used to make the shirt, in contrast to a polo shirt collar, which is usually one-ply ribbed knit cotton. Golf shirts often have a pocket on the left side, to hold a scorepad and pencil, and may not bear a logo there.

See also 

 Rugby shirt
 Sportswear (activewear)

References 

1926 clothing
1920s fashion
1930s fashion
1970s fashion
1980s fashion
1990s fashion
2000s fashion
French inventions
Shirts
Tennis equipment
Tops (clothing)